Dyan may refer to:

People
Dyan Birch (born 1949), British singer
Dyan Buis (born 1990), South African Paralympic athlete
Dyan Cannon (born 1937), American actress, director, screenwriter, producer, and editor
Dyan Castillejo (born 1965), Filipino tennis player and sports reporter
Dyan Sheldon, American novelist
Marissa Dyan (born 1975), American actress

Other uses
Dyan, County Tyrone; see List of townlands of County Tyrone
Dyan language, a Gur language of Burkina Faso
DYAN-TV, a Philippine television station

See also
Dhyan Chand (1905–1979), Indian hockey player